Filipino Indonesian or Indonesian Filipino may be:
Of or relating to Indonesia–Philippines relations
Filipinos in Indonesia
Indonesians in the Philippines